Dawid Hercules Botha (born 1 July 1988) is a Namibian cricketer. He is a right-handed batsman. He has represented the Namibian cricket team in first-class cricket since 2006. He had previously represented the Namibia Under-19s and the Namibian team.

Botha was born in Windhoek. He represented Namibia during the 2006 Under-19s World Cup. Botha was part of the Namibian Under-19 team which won the Under-19 African Championship in 2007. He made his first-class cricket debut on 11 May 2006, for Namibia against Scotland in the 2006–07 ICC Intercontinental Cup.

References

External links
Dawid Botha at Cricket Archive 

1988 births
Namibian cricketers
Living people
Cricketers from Windhoek